Nelson Müller (born February 13, 1979) is a German cook, restaurateur and singer.

Life 
Müller was born on February 13, 1979, as Nelson Nutakor. He is the son of Ghanaian parents. He came to Germany as a toddler, grew up in a German foster family in Stuttgart-Plieningen and attended a Realschule in Filderstadt-Bernhausen. He initially used the family name of his foster parents "Müller" as an artist name. In February 2013 he was adopted by his foster parents and officially took the surname. He maintains contact with his biological parents, who meanwhile live in London.

After training as a cook at the Fissler Post in Stuttgart-Plieningen and in Veneto under Holger Bodendorf in Wenningstedt on Sylt, Müller worked in the starred restaurants Résidence by Henri Bach in Essen and the orangery by Lutz Niemann in the Maritim Hotel Timmendorfer Strand. Since September 2009 he has been the owner of the Schote restaurant in Essen, which was awarded a star by the Michelin Guide in November 2011. In addition, since the beginning of 2014 he has been running Brasserie Müllers auf der Rü at Essen's Rüttenscheider Stern with specialties from the Ruhr area. He gave up the Wallberg restaurant in Saalbau Essen in March 2015 after six months. The Schote restaurant moved to a new location at the end of May. In June 2020, Müller also opened the Müller's Brasserie at the Burg in the Hotel Burg Schwarzenstein in Geisenheim, Hesse.

Literature 

 Meine Rezepte für Body and Soul. Zabert Sandmann, München 2011, .
 Vorwort zum Buch Im Kochtopf um die Welt: Mit Panjo und Emmi von Europa nach Afrika, Amerika, Asien und wieder zurück. Ein Kinderkoch- und Erlebnisbuch. von Cookita e.V., Bo-Bo-Verlag, Bochum 2011, .
 Öfter vegetarisch: Echter Geschmack für Teilzeit-Vegetarier, Dorling Kindersley, München 2016, 
 Heimatliebe. Meine deutsche Küche. Dorling Kindersley, München 2019, .

References

External links 

 Nelson Müller on IMDb
 Cooking website
 Music website

Living people
1979 births
German chefs
German people of Ghanaian descent
Ghanaian emigrants to Germany
Naturalized citizens of Germany
People from Stuttgart